Operation Blue Star was an Indian Armed Forces operation between 1 and 10 June 1984 to remove Damdami Taksal leader Jarnail Singh Bhindranwale and his followers from the buildings of the Golden Temple, the holiest site of Sikhism, in Amritsar, Punjab, India. The decision to launch the operation rested with the Prime Minister of India, then Indira Gandhi, who had already authorized military preparation for a confrontation at the temple complex 18 months prior according to the then-Vice Chief of the Army Staff, S. K. Sinha. In July 1982, Harchand Singh Longowal, the president of the Sikh political party Shiromani Akali Dal, had invited Bhindranwale to take up residence in the Golden Temple to evade arrest by government authorities.

Indian intelligence agencies had reported that three prominent Sikh figures—Shabeg Singh, Balbir Singh and Amrik Singh, referred to in reports as "prominent heads of the Khalistan movement"—had each made at least six trips to neighbouring Pakistan between 1981 and 1983. Shabeg Singh, an Indian Army officer who later deserted to join Bhindranwale, was identified as the provider of weapons training at Akal Takht. The Intelligence Bureau alleged that training was being provided at various gurdwaras throughout Jammu and Kashmir and Himachal Pradesh. Amrik Singh responded to these allegations by stating that student training camps with "traditional weapons" had existed for four decades at these locations. The KGB intelligence agency of the Soviet Union had tipped off India's Research and Analysis Wing (R&AW) about a joint operation between Pakistan's Inter-Services Intelligence (ISI) and the United States' Central Intelligence Agency (CIA) to stir separatist unrest in the Indian state of Punjab. False claims were also made that R&AW had received intelligence by interrogating a Pakistani soldier that over a thousand Special Service Group commandos of the Pakistan Army had been dispatched by the Pakistani government into Indian Punjab to assist Bhindranwale in his fight against the Indian government; however, no signs of commandos were found and no proofs were provided by R&AW.

In 1981, the Soviets launched Operation Kontakt, which was based on a forged document purporting to contain details of the weapons and money provided by the ISI to Sikh militants who wanted to create an independent country. In November 1982, Yuri Andropov, the General Secretary of the Communist Party and leader of the Soviet Union, approved a proposal to fabricate Pakistani intelligence documents detailing ISI plans to foment religious disturbances in Punjab and promote the creation of Khalistan as an independent Sikh state. Indira Gandhi's decision to move troops into the Punjab was based on her taking seriously the information provided by the Soviets regarding secret CIA support for the Sikhs.

Leading up to Operation Bluestar, there were several protests by Sangh Parivar, including a march led by LK Advani and AB Vajpayee of the Bhartiya Janta Party to protest against the lack of government action and to demand that the Indian Army be sent into the Golden Temple.

On 1 June 1984, after negotiations with the militants failed, Indira Gandhi rejected the Anandpur Resolution and ordered the army to launch Operation Blue Star, simultaneously attacking scores of Sikh temples across Punjab. Indian security forces commenced Operation Blue Star when they fired into various buildings, which resulted in the deaths of eight civilians. A variety of army units and paramilitary forces surrounded the Golden Temple complex on 3 June 1984. The official stance of the army was that warnings were made to facilitate the evacuation of pilgrims but that no surrender occurred by June 5 at 7:00 pm. However, in April 2017 the Amritsar District and Sessions Judge Gurbir Singh gave a ruling which stated that there was no evidence that the Indian army provided warnings for pilgrims to leave the temple complex before commencing their assault. The army's assault on the temple complex ended on June 8. A mopping-up operation, Operation Woodrose, was then initiated throughout Punjab.

The army had underestimated the firepower possessed by the militants, whose armaments included Chinese-made rocket-propelled grenade launchers and ammunition with armour-piercing capabilities. Tanks and heavy artillery were used to attack the militants, who responded with anti-tank and machine-gun fire from the heavily fortified Akal Takht. After a 24-hour firefight, the army gained control of the temple complex. The official casualty figures for the army were 83 dead and 249 injured. The government-issued white paper stated that 1,592 militants were apprehended and there were 554 combined militant and civilian casualties, much lower than independent estimates. According to the government, high civilian casualties were attributed to militants using pilgrims trapped inside the temple as human shields. However, the Indian army had allowed thousands of pilgrims and protestors to enter the temple complex on 3 June 1984 and prevented them from leaving after imposing a curfew at 10:00 pm on the same day. Eyewitnesses alleged that on 6 June, after the fighting had stopped, the Indian military executed detainees who had their arms tied behind their backs and fired on men and women who had heeded the announcements of the military to evacuate.

The military action in the temple complex was criticized by Sikhs worldwide, who interpreted it as an assault on the Sikh religion. Many Sikh soldiers in the army deserted their units, several Sikhs resigned from civil administrative office and returned awards received from the Indian government. Five months after the operation, on 31 October 1984, Indira Gandhi was assassinated in an act of revenge by her two Sikh bodyguards, Satwant Singh and Beant Singh. Public outcry over Gandhi's death led to the ensuing 1984 anti-Sikh riots.

Akal Takht complex

Following the events of the 1978 Sikh-Nirankari clashes and the Dharam Yudh Morcha, Jarnail Singh Bhindranwale had risen to prominence in Sikh political circles with his policy of getting the Anandpur Resolution passed, failing which he wanted to declare a separate country of Khalistan as a homeland for Sikhs. Despite the resolution declaring its goals within the context of the state, and leaving the powers of Foreign Relations, Defense, Currency and General Communications subject to the jurisdiction of the central government, Indira Gandhi, the leader of the Akali Dal's rival Congress, viewed the Anandpur Sahib Resolution as a secessionist document. This was despite the fact that Harchand Singh Longwal, the leader of the Akali Dal, stated that "Let us make it clear once and for all that the Sikhs have no designs to get away from India in any manner. What they simply want is that they should be allowed to live within India as Sikhs, free from all direct and indirect interference and tampering with their religious way of life. Undoubtedly, the Sikhs have the same nationality as other Indians."

One of the main aims of the KGB active measures in the early 1980s was to manufacture evidence that the CIA and Pakistani intelligence were behind the growth of Sikh separatism in Punjab. In 1981 the Soviets launched Operation Kontakt that was based on a forged document purporting to contain details of the weapons and money provided by the ISI to Sikh militants who wanted to create an independent country. According to agent reports, the level of anxiety in the Indian embassy regarding Pakistani support for Sikh separatists indicated that KONTAKT was successfully achieving its goals of creating an alarmist effect. The Soviets used a new recruit in the New Delhi residency named “Agent S” who was close to Indira Gandhi as a major channel for providing her information. Agent S provided Indira Gandhi with false documents purporting to show Pakistani involvement in the Khalistan conspiracy. In November 1982 Yuri Andropov, the leader of the Soviet Union, approved a proposal to fabricate Pakistani intelligence documents detailing ISI plans to foment religious disturbances in Punjab and promote the creation of Khalistan as an independent Sikh state. The KGB became confident that it could continue to deceive Indira Gandhi indefinitely with fabricated reports of CIA and Pakistani conspiracies against her. The Soviets persuaded Rajiv Gandhi during a visit to Moscow in 1983 that the CIA was engaged in subversion in the Punjab. When Rajiv Gandhi returned to India, he declared this to be true. Indira Gandhi's decision to move troops into the Punjab was based on her taking seriously the disinformation provided by the Soviets regarding secret CIA support for the Sikhs. The KGB was responsible for Indira Gandhi exaggerating the threats posed by both the CIA and Pakistan. The KGB role in facilitating Operation Bluestar was acknowledged by Subramanian Swamy who stated in 1992 “The 1984 Operation Bluestar became necessary because of the vast disinformation against Sant Bhindranwale by the KGB, and repeated inside Parliament by the Congress Party of India."

Guru Nanak Niwas
In July 1982, the then President of Shiromani Akali Dal, Harchand Singh Longowal, invited Bhindranwale to take up residence at the Golden Temple complex. He called Bhindranwale "our stave to beat the government." On 19 July 1982, Bhindranwale took shelter with approximately 200 armed followers in the Guru Nanak Niwas (Guest house), in the precincts of the Golden Temple. Bhindranwale had made Golden Temple complex his headquarters. From there he met and was interviewed by international television crews. Since the 1978 clashes, after which the Sant Nirankaris were acquitted despite initiating the clash, Bhindranwale's followers had begun keeping firearms and fortified the Gurdwara that served as the headquarters of the Damdami Taksal religious center.

On 23 April 1983, Punjab Police Deputy Inspector General A. S. Atwal was shot dead by a gunman in the complex as he left the Harmandir Sahib compound. The following day, Longowal accused Bhindranwale of involvement in the murder. The Punjab Assembly noted that the murder in the temple premises confirmed the charges that the extremists were being sheltered and given active support in religious places and the Guru Nanak Niwas, while Bhindranwale was openly supporting such elements. After the murder of six Hindu bus passengers in October 1983, President's rule was imposed in Punjab. This led to increasing communal tension between Sikhs and Hindus as Hindu mobs in Karnal, Haryana murdered 8 Sikhs and set fire to a Gurdwara on February 19, 1984.

Occupation

During debate in the Parliament of India members of both houses demanded the arrest of Bhindranwale. Sensing a prospect of his arrest from the hostel premises, he convinced SGPC president Tohra to set up his headquarter in Akal Takht (a shrine representing the temporal power of God) in the Golden Temple. The temple high priest protested this move as a sacrilege since no Guru or leader ever resided in the Akal Takht on the floor above Granth Sahib, but Tohra agreed to Bhindranwale's demand to prevent his arrest. On 15 December 1983, Bhindranwale was asked to move out of Guru Nanak Niwas house by members of the Babbar Khalsa, who opposed Bhindranwale, who acted with Longowal's support. Longowal by now feared for his own safety. Tohra convinced the high priest to allow Bhindranwale to reside on the first floor of Akal Takht, as he had nowhere to go to avoid arrest. He said that he had to move to Akal Takht as Morcha director Longowal was negotiating with the government for his arrest. The government said Bhindranwale and his followers had made the Golden Temple complex an armoury and headquarters, though amassing arms and usage as a base for waging war was part of the tradition of most historical gurdwaras, which display weapons caches used by the Gurus, depicting the centrality of Sikh sites to their struggles.

A few leaders raised their voice against Bhindranwale in the Akal Takht complex and other gurdwaras across the state. Among the prominent ones was Giani Partap Singh, a spiritual leader and former Jathedar of the Akal Takht, who criticized Bhindranwale for keeping guns in the Akal Takht. Partap was later killed along with other dissenters including Harbans Singh Manchanda, the Delhi Sikh Gurudwara Management Committee president, Niranjan Singh, the Granthi of Gurudwara Toot Sahib, Granthi Jarnail Singh of Valtoha and Granthi Surat Singh of Majauli.

The militants were able to claim safe haven in the most sacred place for the Sikhs due to the whole or partial support received by them from key Sikh religious leaders and institutions such as the SGPC, AISSF and Jathedar (head) of the Akal Takht. The support was either voluntary or forced by using violence or threat of violence.

Negotiations
In January 1984, India's secret service Research & Analysis Wing (RAW) prepared a covert plan codenamed Operation Sundown involving special forces to abduct Bhindranwale from the Golden Temple complex. A RAW unit was formed to rehearse Operation Sundown in the Sarsawa Air Force Base in Uttar Pradesh, but the operation never materialized due to Indira Gandhi's rejection.

The government sent a team led by Narasimha Rao to try to convince Bhindranwale to back out but he was adamant. The negotiations failed and the law and order situation in Punjab continued to deteriorate. Indira Gandhi tried to persuade the Akalis to support her in the arrest of Bhindranwale peacefully. These talks ended up being futile. In the days before the assault, government representatives met with Bhindranwale in a last ditch effort to negotiate a truce. The Sikhs would withdraw, believing they had seen a commando unit move into the city. Bhindranwale warned of a backlash by the Sikh community in the event of an armed assault on the Golden Temple. On 26 May, Tohra informed the government that he had failed to get Bhindranwale to agree to a peaceful resolution of the crisis, and that Bhindranwale was no longer under anyone's control. Faced with imminent army action and with Harchand Singh Longowal abandoning him, Bhindranwale declared "This bird is alone. There are many hunters after it". In his final interview to Subhash Kirpekar, Bhindranwale stated that Sikhs can neither live in India nor with India.

Indira Gandhi then gave her permission to initiate Operation Blue Star on the recommendation of Army Chief Arun Shridhar Vaidya. She was apparently led to believe and had assumed that Operation Blue Star would not involve any civilian casualties. The assumption was that when confronted Bhindranwale would surrender to the army.

Preparations

Fortification of Golden Temple
An arsenal had been created within the Akal Takht over a period of several months. It was reported that trucks engaged for kar seva (religious service) and bringing in supplies for the daily langar were smuggling in guns and ammunition. The police never attempted to check these vehicles entering the Golden Temple,  on instructions from superiors. During a random check one such truck was stopped and many Sten guns and ammunition were found. The Indian government White Paper alleged that after Operation Blue Star it was found that the militants had set up a grenade manufacturing facility, and a workshop for the fabrication of Sten-guns inside the Temple Complex. However, the allegations of the militants being in possession of weapon workshops was never made prior to Operation Bluestar, and only after, with only the Army making these statements The statements of multiple civilian eyewitnesses instead were consistent that the militants were a small number of men and had limited arms that were used sparingly.

The Harmandir Sahib compound and some of the surrounding houses were fortified under the guidance of Major General Shabeg Singh, who had joined Bhindranwale's group after dismissal from the army. During their occupation of Akal Takht, Bhindranwale's group had begun fortifying the building. The Statesman reported that light machine guns and semi-automatic rifles were known to have been brought into the compound, and strategically placed to defend against an armed assault on the complex. The modern weapons later found inside the temple complex indicated that foreign elements were involved. The heavier weapons were found to have Pakistani or Chinese markings on them.

Holes were smashed through the marble walls of Akal takht to create gun positions. Walls were broken to allow entry points to the tiled courtyards. Secure machine gun nests were created. All of these positions were protected by sandbags and newly made brick walls. The windows and arches of Akal Takht were blocked with bricks and sandbags. Sandbags were placed on the turrets. Every strategically significant building of the temple complex, apart from the Harmandir Sahib in the center, had been fortified in a similar manner and allegedly defaced. The fortifications also included seventeen private houses in the residential area near the Temple. All the high rise buildings and towers near the temple complex were occupied. The militants manning these vantage points were in wireless contact with Shabeg Singh in Akal Takht. Under the military leadership of Major General Singh, ex-army veterans and deserters had trained Bhindranwale's men.

The militants in the complex were anticipating an attack by government troops. The defences in the complex were created with the purpose of stalling an assault, giving time to provoke Sikhs in the villages and encourage them to march en masse towards the Golden Temple in support of the militants. Sufficient food to last a month was stocked in the complex.

During this period police and security forces stationed around the temple complex were allowed only within 200 yards. This was to avoid the 'desecration' of the temple by their presence. The security forces were prevented by the politicians from taking action in enforcing the law. Even self-defence from the militants was made difficult. On 14 February 1984, a police post near the entrance of the Temple was attacked by a group of militants. Six fully armed policemen were captured and taken inside. After twenty four hours the police responded and sent in a senior police officer for negotiation. He asked Bhindranwale to release his men, along with their weapons. Bhindranwale agreed and delivered the dead body of one of the hostages who had been killed. Later the remaining five policemen were released alive, but their weapons were kept.

The fortifications of the temple denied the army the possibility of commando operations. The buildings were close together and had labyrinthine passages all under the control of the militants. Militants in the temple premises had access to langars, food supplies, and water from the Sarovar (temple pond). Militants were well stocked with weapons and ammunition. Any siege under these circumstances would have been long and difficult. The option of laying down a long siege was ruled out by the army due to the risk of emotionally aroused villagers marching to the temple and clashing with the army. The negotiated settlement had already been rejected by Bhindranwale and the government decided to raid the temple.

Rise in militant incidents

As high-handed police methods normally used on common criminals were used on protesters during the Dharam Yudh Morcha, creating state repression affecting a very large segment of Punjab's population, retaliatory violence came from a section of the Sikh population, widening the scope of the conflict by the use of violence of the state on its own people, creating fresh motives for Sikh youth to turn to insurgency. The concept of Khalistan was still vague even while the complex was fortified under the influence of former Sikh army officials alienated by government actions who now advised Bhindranwale, Major General Shabeg Singh and retired Major General and Brigadier Mohinder Singh, and at that point the concept was still not directly connected with the movement he headed. In other parts of Punjab, a "state of chaos and repressive police methods" combined to create "a mood of overwhelming anger and resentment in the Sikh masses against the authorities," making Bhindranwale even more popular, and demands of independence gain currency, even amongst moderates and Sikh intellectuals.

On 12 May 1984, Ramesh Chander, son of Lala Jagat Narain and editor of media house Hind Samachar group, was murdered by pro-Bhindranwale militants. In addition, seven editors and seven news hawkers and newsagents were killed in a planned attack on the freedom of media house, to cripple it financially. Punjab Police had to provide protection for the entire distribution staff.

Violent incidents including arson, bombings, and shootings increased over the following months. The total number of deaths was 410 in violent incidents and riots, and 1,180 people were injured.

The government never provided evidence of the supposedly planned massacre of Hindus that triggered Operation Blue Star, although the pace of attacks was increasing. Congress member of parliament Amarjit Kaur, who referred to the Akali Dal as "the enemy within" and who had opposed the creation of the Punjabi Suba, alleged that Bhindranwale wanted to start a civil war between the Hindus and Sikhs. Meanwhile, the number of killings had been rising all over the state, with sometimes more than a dozen a day. On 2 June in the last 24 hours before the announcement of the operation 23 people were killed.

In June 1984, the army was called out to help the civil administration in Punjab in response to a request from the Punjab Governor, B. D. Pande, "in view of the escalating violence by terrorists in Punjab". On 2 June Operation Blue Star had been initiated to flush out the militants from the Golden Temple.

Militants had already started the movement to drive Hindus out of certain areas to make way for Sikhs coming in from other states. Due to the increased incidents of religious violence, exchange of population had already started in Punjab. New Khalistani currency was being printed and distributed. By May 1984, the establishment of an independent Khalistan seemed imminent, as the Indian government had "received intelligence" that Pakistan had been supporting the militants with arms and money, and if Khalistan declared its independence there was the risk of Pakistan recognizing the new country and sending the Pakistani Army into Indian Punjab to protect it. However, the Indian government had been the target of disinformation by the KGB which had deliberately sought to implicate the ISI in the Khalistan movement by spreading forged documents and reports to the Indian government.

Operation 

Operation Blue Star was launched to remove Jarnail Singh Bhindranwale and his followers who had sought cover in the Amritsar Harmandir Sahib Complex.

On 3 June, a 36-hour curfew was imposed on the state of Punjab with all methods of communication and public travel suspended. The electricity supply was also interrupted, creating a total blackout and cutting off the state from the rest of the world. Complete media censorship was enforced.

The army stormed Harmandir Sahib on the night of 5 June under the command of Kuldip Singh Brar. The forces had full control of Harmandir Sahib by the morning of 7 June. There were casualties among the army, civilians, and militants. Sikh leaders Bhindranwale and Shabeg Singh were killed in the operation.

Generals
The armed Sikhs within the Harmandir Sahib were led by Bhindranwale, former Maj. Gen. Shabeg Singh, and Amrik Singh, the President of the All India Sikh Students Federation from Damdami Taksal.

General Arun Shridhar Vaidya was the Chief of the Indian Army. General Vaidya, assisted by Lt. Gen. Sundarji as Vice-Chief, planned and coordinated Operation Blue Star. From the Indian Army Lt. Gen. Kuldip Singh Brar had command of the action, operating under General Krishnaswamy Sundarji. On 31 May he had been summoned from Meerut and asked to lead the operation to remove the militants from the temple. Brar was a Jat Sikh, the same caste as Bhindranwale, and was also acquainted with Shabeg Singh, having been his student at the Indian Military Academy at Dehradun. Among the six generals leading the operation, four were Sikhs.

The army operation was further subdivided along two subcategories:

 Operation Metal: To take out the militants including Bhindranwale from the Golden Temple complex. Brar's 9 Infantry Division was deputed for this.
 Operation Shop: To attack extremist areas throughout the Punjab state and deal with remaining militants in the countryside.

In addition, the army carried out Operation Woodrose, in which units were deployed to the border areas, replacing the pickets routinely held by the paramilitary Border Security Force. The border pickets were held in at least company strength.

1 June 
On 1 June 1984 the Indian security forces fired into various buildings with the goal of assessing the training of the militants. Eyewitness testimony of pilgrims inside the temple complex state that the Harmandir Sahib was fired on initially by security forces on 1 June and not 5 June as reported by the army.  The exercise lasted for seven hours and resulted in the main shrine of the Harmandir Sahib sustaining 34 bullet marks. The action claimed the lives of eight pilgrims, including a woman and a child, inside the temple complex and injured 25 others. Devinder Singh Duggal, who was in-charge of the Sikh Reference Library located inside of the Golden Temple complex and an eye-witness to Operation Blue Star, stated that the militants were given instructions to not fire until the army or security forces entered the temple. Duggal stated "...when I heard in the news bulletin that there was unprovoked firing from inside the Temple, but that the security forces showed extreme restrain and did not fire a single shot, I was surprised at this naked lie". The deaths of at least three of the pilgrims was confirmed by the eyewitness testimony of a female Sikh student who had dressed their wounds and who later witnessed their deaths in Guru Nanak Nivas. Furthermore, Duggal stated that on 2 June 1984 a team of the BBC, including Mark Tully, were taken around the Darbar Sahib and shown 34 holes, some of them as big as three inches in diameter, caused by the bullets on all sides of the temple. Mark Tully noted, “The C.R.P.F. firing took place four days before the army actually entered the Temple”.

2 June 
The army had already sealed the international border from Kashmir to Ganga Nagar, Rajasthan. At least seven divisions of troops were deployed in villages of Punjab. The soldiers began taking control of the city of Amritsar from the paramilitary. A young Sikh officer posing as a pilgrim was sent in to reconnoitre the temple. He spent an hour in the complex noting defensive preparations. Plans were made to clear vantage points occupied by militants outside the complex before the main assault. Patrols were also sent to study these locations.

As the Indian army was sealing off exits out of Amritsar, it continued to allow pilgrims to enter the temple complex. All outgoing trains from Amritsar had left by noon and other trains were cancelled. The CRPF outside the temple had been replaced by the army who were taking into custody any visitors leaving the temple. A pilgrim who survived the assault stated that he did not leave the temple because of the detention of visitors by the army.

By nightfall media and the press were gagged and rail, road and air services in Punjab were suspended. Foreigners and NRIs were denied entry. General Gauri Shankar was appointed as the Security Advisor to the Governor of Punjab. The water and electricity supply was cut off.

3 June 
According to an All Sikhs Student Federation member, 10,000 people had come from outside including many women and 4000 of them were young people. The Shiromani Gurdwara Prabhandak Committee estimates that approximately 10,000 to 15,000 pilgrims had come from Punjab's cities and villages to attend the Gurparab. Along with the pilgrims were 1300 Akali workers led by Jathedar Nachattar Singh who had come to participate in the Dharam Yudh Morcha and to court arrest. The Akali jathas who were also present consisted of about 200 women, 18 children and about 1100 men and were also forced to stay inside the temple complex. Those who were inside were not allowed to go out after 10:00 pm on 3 June because of the curfew placed by the military.

In addition, as of 3 June the pilgrims who had entered the temple in the days prior were unaware that Punjab had been placed under curfew. Thousands of pilgrims and hundreds of Akali workers had been allowed to collect inside the Temple complex without any warning either of the sudden curfew or imminent Army attack.

In the night the curfew was re-imposed with the army and para-military patrolling all of Punjab. The army sealed off all routes of ingress and exit around the temple complex.

Army units led by Indian Army Lt. Gen Kuldip Singh Brar surrounded the temple complex on 3 June 1984. Just before the commencement of the operation, K.S. Brar addressed the soldiers:

However, no one opted out and that included many "Sikh officers, junior commissioned officers and other ranks".

4 June 

On 4 and 5 June, messages asking pilgrims to leave the temple were played over loudspeakers. However, in 2017 the Amritsar District and Sessions Judge Gurbir Singh gave a ruling which stated that there was no evidence that the Indian army provided warnings for pilgrims to leave the temple complex before commencing their assault. Judge Gurbir Singh wrote in his ruling, "There is no evidence that army made any announcements asking ordinary civilians to leave Golden Temple complex before launching the operation in 1984...There is no written record of any public announcement by the civil authorities requesting the people to come out of the complex. No log of vehicle used for making such announcements is there...The event underlines the human rights violations by troops during the operation. The lack of evidence of any warning to vacate the temple complex was the basis of a compensatory award given to Sikhs who had been illegally detained by the Indian military. The army began bombarding the historic Ramgarhia Bunga, the water tank, and other fortified positions with Ordnance QF 25-pounder artillery. After destroying the outer defences laid by Shabeg Singh, the army moved tanks and APCs onto the road separating the Guru Nanak Niwas building.

The army helicopters spotted the massive movements, and General K. Sunderji sent tanks and APCs to meet them.

The accounts of survivors inside of the temple complex were consistent with the military commencing its assault in the early morning of June 4. Duggal states that the army attack started at 4:00 am with a 25-pounder that fell in the ramparts of the Deori to the left of the Akal Takht Sahib. Duggal further states that during the assault he saw a number of dead bodies of children and women in the Parikrama. The army's assault had prevented Duggal from leaving the room in which he had taken shelter as he believed it would have resulted in his death. Another eyewitness, Bhan Singh the Secretary of the SGPC, states that the army provided no warning of the start of the attack which prevented pilgrims and those who came as a part of the Dharam Yudh Morcha from exiting. A female survivor recalled that it was not until the army began using explosives on the temple that they were aware that it had commenced its assault. She further stated that within the Harmandir Sahib, there were some garanthis (priests), ragis (singers), sevadars (employees) and yatris (pilgrims) but no armed terrorists. Prithpal Singh, the sevadar on duty at the Akal rest house which housed pilgrims, stated that it was shelled by the military. As of May 1985 during the recording of Prithpal's account, the Akal Rest house still bore the bullet marks caused by the Indian Army.

5 June 

On 5 June the blind head Ragi of the Harmandir Sahib Amrik Singh and Ragi Avtar Singh, were struck by bullets inside of the Harmandir Sahib by the Indian army. The army's targeting of the Harmandir Sahib with bullets was in contrast to the alleged restraint stated in the army issued White Paper on 10 July 1984. As of 5 June pilgrims who had reached the temple on 3 June were still present hiding in rooms. In one room 40-50 persons were huddled together including a six-month-old child during the army's assault. A female survivor of the assault stated that the army asked people to leave their hiding spots and guaranteed safe passage and water; she recalled seeing the dead bodies of pilgrims who answered the announcements lying in the Parikrama the next morning.

In the morning, shelling started on the building inside the Harmandir Sahib complex. The 9th division launched a frontal attack on the Akal Takht, although it was unable to secure the building. The Golden Temple complex had honeycombed tunnel structures.

7:00 pm

The BSF and CRPF attacked Hotel Temple View and Brahm Boota Akhara, respectively, on the southwest fringes of the complex. By 10:00 pm both the structures were under their control. The army simultaneously attacked various other gurdwaras. Sources mention either 42 or 74 locations.

10:00 pm – 7:30 am

Late in the evening, the generals decided to launch a simultaneous attack from three sides. Ten Guards, 1 Para Commandos and Special Frontier Force (SFF) would attack from the main entrance of the complex, and 26 Madras and 9 Kumaon battalions from the hostel complex side entrance from the south. The objective of the 10 Guards was to secure the northern wing of the Temple complex and draw attention away from SFF who were to secure the western wing of the complex and 1 Para Commandos who were to gain a foothold in Akal Takht and in Harmandir Sahab, with the help of divers. Twenty-six Madras was tasked with securing the southern and the eastern complexes, and the 9 Kumaon regiment with SGPC building and Guru Ramdas Serai. Twelve Bihar was charged with providing a cordon and fire support to the other regiments by neutralising enemy positions under their observance.

An initial attempt by the commandos to gain a foothold at Darshani Deori failed as they came under devastating fire, after which several further attempts were made with varying degrees of success. Eventually, other teams managed to reach Darshani Deori, a building north of the Nishan Sahib, and started to fire at the Akal Takth and a red building towards its left, so that the SFF troops could get closer to the Darshani Deori and fire gas canisters at Akal Takth. The canisters bounced off the building and affected the troops instead.

Meanwhile, 26 Madras and 9 Garhwal Rifles (reserve troops) had come under heavy fire from the Langar rooftop, Guru Ramdas Serai and the buildings in the vicinity. Moreover, they took a lot of time in forcing open the heavy Southern Gate, which had to be shot open with tank fire. This delay caused a lot of casualties among the Indian troops fighting inside the complex. Three tanks and an APC had entered the complex.

Crawling was impossible as Shabeg Singh had placed light machine guns nine or ten inches above the ground. The attempt caused many casualties among the Indian troops. A third attempt to gain the Pool was made by a squad of 200 commandos. On the southern side, the Madras and Garhwal battalions were not able to make it to the pavement around the pool because they were engaged by positions on the southern side.

Despite the mounting casualties, General Sunderji ordered a fourth assault by the commandos. This time, the Madras battalion was reinforced with two more companies of the 7th Garhwal Rifles under the command of General Kuldip Singh Brar. However, the Madras and Garhwal troops under Brigadier A. K. Dewan once again failed to move towards the parikarma (the pavement around the pool).

Brigadier Dewan reported heavy casualties and requested more reinforcements. General Brar sent two companies of 15 Kumaon Regiment. This resulted in yet more heavy casualties, forcing Brigadier Dewan to request tank support. As one APC inched closer to the Akal Takth it was hit with an anti-tank RPG, which immediately immobilized it. Brar also requested tank support. The tanks received the clearance to fire their main guns (105 mm high-explosive squash head shells) only at around 7:30 am.

6 June 

Vijayanta tanks shelled the Akal Takht. It suffered some damage but the structure was still standing. The Special Group, a confidential special forces unit of the R&AW, began its planned raid on this day.

7 June 
The army entered the Akal Takht. Dead bodies of Bhindranwale, Shabeg Singh and Amrik Singh were discovered in the building. The army gained effective control of the Harmandir Sahib complex.

8–10 June 

The army fought about four Sikhs holed up in basement of a tower. A colonel of the commandos was shot dead by an LMG burst while trying to force his way into the basement. By the afternoon of 10 June, the operation was over.

Casualties
The Indian army initially placed total casualties at 554 Sikh militants and civilians dead, and 83 killed (4 officers, 79 soldiers) and 236 wounded among government forces. Kuldip Nayar cites Rajiv Gandhi as admitting that nearly 700 soldiers were killed. This number was disclosed by Gandhi in September 1984 as he was addressing the National student Union of India session in Nagpur.

Independent casualty figures were much higher. Bhindranwale and large number of his militants were killed. There were high civilian casualties as well, which the Indian government argued were due to Sikhs in the Golden Temple using pilgrims trapped inside the temple as human shields, though the operation was conducted at a time when the Golden Temple was packed to capacity with pilgrims who were there to celebrate the annual martyrdom anniversary of Guru Arjan Dev, the fifth Guru of the Sikhs. The pilgrims were not allowed by the militants to escape from the temple premises in spite of relaxation in the curfew hours by the security forces. According to Indian army generals, "it is possible" that militants were "depending upon the Sikh masses to form a human shield to prevent action by the army," as well as the presence of a "whole lot of moderate Akali leadership."

U.K. Foreign Secretary William Hague attributed high civilian casualties to the Indian Government's attempt at a full frontal assault on the militants, diverging from the recommendations provided by the U.K. Military. The Indian military had created a situation where civilians were allowed to collect inside of the temple complex. On 3 June the Indian military allowed pilgrims to enter the temple complex. The Indian military also allowed thousands of protestors whom were a part of the Dharam Yudh Morcha to enter the temple complex. These protestors included women and children. There was no warning provided to the pilgrims who entered on 3 June that a curfew was put in place by the military. These pilgrims were prevented from leaving after the curfew had been placed by the army at approximately 10:00 pm.

On 4 June no warning was provided to the pilgrims to evacuate and the pilgrims were deterred of leaving as the Indian army would arrest anyone who left the temple complex. Although officially the army stated that it made announcements, the eyewitness testimony of pilgrims who were arrested after the assault was used as the basis of a decision in the Amritsar district court in April 2017 which held that the army made no such announcements. The eyewitness testimony of survivors of the army's assault on the temple complex were consistent with stating that they were unaware of the start of the attack by the army until it took place without notice on the morning of 4 June.

On 6 June the Indian military detained surviving pilgrims on the grounds that they were affiliated with the militants and subjected them to interrogations, beatings and executions.

Aftermath
President Zail Singh visited the temple premises after the operation, while making the round, he was shot at by a sniper from one of the buildings that the army had not yet cleared. The bullet hit the arm of an army colonel accompanying the president. The operation also led to the assassination of Prime Minister Indira Gandhi on 31 October 1984 by two of her Sikh bodyguards as an act of vengeance, triggering the 1984 anti-Sikh riots. The widespread killing of Sikhs, principally in the national capital Delhi but also in other major cities in North India, led to major divisions between the Sikh community and the Indian Government. The army withdrew from Harmandir Sahib later in 1984 under pressure from Sikh demands. The 1985 bombing of Air India Flight 182 is thought to have been a revenge action.

General Arun Shridhar Vaidya, the Chief of Army Staff at the time of Operation Blue Star, was assassinated in 1986 in Pune by two Sikhs, Harjinder Singh Jinda and Sukhdev Singh Sukha. Both were sentenced to death, and hanged on 7 October 1992.

In March 1986, Sikh militants again occupied and continued to use the temple compound which necessitated another police action known as Operation Black Thunder on 1 May 1986, Indian paramilitary police entered the temple and arrested 200 militants that had occupied Harmandir Sahib for more than three months. On 2 May 1986 the paramilitary police undertook a 12-hour operation to take control of Harmandir Sahib at Amritsar from several hundred militants, but almost all the major radical leaders managed to escape. In June 1990, the Indian government ordered the area surrounding the temple to be vacated by local residents in order to prevent militants activity around the temple.

Mutinies by Sikh soldiers 
As the aftermath of the Operation Blue Star, cases of mutinies by Sikh soldiers, mostly raw recruits, were reported from different places. On 7 June, six hundred soldiers of the 9th Battalion of the Sikh Regiment, almost the entire other ranks' strength, mutinied in Sri Ganganagar. While some managed to escape to Pakistan, most were rounded up by men of Rajputana Rifles. The largest mutiny took place in Sikh Regimental Centre at Ramgarh in Bihar where recruits for the Sikh Regiment are trained. There, 1,461 soldiers—1,050 of them raw recruits, stormed the armoury, killing one officer and injuring two before they set out for Amritsar. The leaders of the mutiny divided the troops into two groups just outside of Banaras to avoid a rumoured roadblock. One half was engaged by army artillery at Shakteshgarh railway station; those who managed to escape were rounded up by 21st Mechanised Infantry Regiment. The other half engaged with the artillery and troops of 20th Infantry Brigade, during which 35 soldiers (both sides) were killed. There were five more smaller mutinies in different parts of India. In total 55 mutineers were killed and 2,606 were captured alive.

The captured mutineers were court-martialed, despite efforts by various groups including retired Sikh officers to get them reinstated. In August 1985, 900 of the 2,606 mutineers were rehabilitated by the Central government as part of the Rajiv-Longowal accord.

Long term effects

The long-term results of the operation included:
 Intended to end the insurgency, the operation, had the opposite effect, with attacks escalating. There was more violence in Punjab after Operation Bluestar than prior. Official estimates of civilians, police, and terrorists killed increased from 27 in 1981, 22 in 1982, and 99 in 1983 to more than one thousand per year from 1987 to 1992.
 Outraging Sikhs all over India, with most finding it unacceptable that the armed forces had desecrated the Golden Temple, thousands of young men can join the Khalistan movement, with "organized insurgency not taking root in Punjab until after the operation." Sikhs became outraged with the military action in the bastion of Sikhi that provoked a wave of deep anguish and long-term resentment.
 The operation inflamed tensions in Punjab, though independence would only be declared by a Sarbat Khalsa in 1986, as 500,000 deployed Indian troops operated violently in Punjab, causing an estimated 250,000 Sikh deaths between 1984 and 1992. This is contested by various fact checkers  The reality is, a total of 21,532 persons were killed between 1981 and 1995 in connection with Khalistani terror, including 8,090 categorised as terrorists; 11,696 civilians, almost all killed by the Khalistanis, but including some who lost their lives in ‘crossfire’; and 1,746 security force personnel (1,415 of the Punjab Police alone) killed by the terrorists. This figure might not have considered 25,000 disappearances and cremation of unidentified bodies in Punjab which was being investigated by human rights activist Jaswant Singh Khalra.

Following the operation the central government demolished hundreds of houses and created a corridor around the compound called "Galliara" (also spelled Galiara or Galyara) for security reasons. This was made into a public park and opened in June 1988.

Criticisms
The operation has been criticized on several grounds including: the government's choice of timing for the attack, the heavy casualties, the loss of property, and human rights violations.

Timing
Operation Blue Star was planned on a Sikh religious day—the martyrdom day of Guru Arjan Dev, the founder of the Harmandir Sahib. Sikhs from all over the world visit the temple on this day. Many Sikhs view the timing and attack by the army as an attempt to inflict maximum casualties on Sikhs and demoralize them, and the government is in turn blamed for the inflated number of civilian casualties by choosing to attack on that day. Additionally, Longowal had announced a statewide civil disobedience movement that would launch on 3 June 1984. Participants planned to block the flow of grain out of Punjab and refuse to pay land revenue, water and electricity bills.

When asked about why the army entered the temple premises just after Guru Arjan Dev's martyrdom day (when the number of devotees is much higher), General Brar said that it was just a coincidence and that while he could not "comment on the inside of politics," he "assume[d] that after taking everything into consideration, the prime minister and the government decided this was the only course of action left," with "perhaps" the army having only had three to four days to complete the operation. Based on "some sort of information," Bhindranwale was planning to declare Khalistan an independent country any moment with "a strong possibility" of support from Pakistan, and "Khalistani currency had already been distributed." This declaration "might" have increased chances of "large sections" of Punjab Police and security personnel siding with Bhindranwale; as "if there could be desertions in the army, then the police, who were in Punjab, who were privy to Bhindranwale's speeches, might have [also deserted]," as "they were also emotionally charged by what was happening." The army waited for the surrender of militants on the night of 5 June but the surrender did not happen. The operation had to be completed before dawn. Otherwise, exaggerated messages of army besieging the temple would have attracted mobs from nearby villages to the temple premises. The army could not have fired upon these civilians. More importantly, Pakistan would have come in the picture, declaring its support for Khalistan. He described the operation as traumatic and painful, but necessary.

Media censorship
Before the attack by the army, a media blackout was imposed in Punjab. The Times reporter Michael Hamlyn reported that journalists were picked up from their hotels at 5 a.m. in a military bus, taken to the adjoining border of the state of Haryana and "were abandoned there." The main towns in Punjab were put under curfew, transportation was banned, a news blackout was imposed, and Punjab was "cut off from the outside world." A group of journalists who later tried to drive into Punjab were stopped at the road block at Punjab border and were threatened with being shot if they proceeded. Indian nationals who worked with the foreign media also were banned from the area. The press criticized these actions by government as an "obvious attempt to attack the temple without the eyes of the foreign press on them." The media blackout throughout Punjab resulted in spread of rumours. The only available source of information during the period was All India Radio and the Doordarshan channel.

Human rights

Sikh militants 
The government issued White Paper alleged that on June 6, a group of some 350 people, including Longowal and Tohra surrendered to the army near the Guru Nanak Niwas. The White Paper further alleged that to prevent the surrender, the militants opened fire and threw grenades at the group resulting in the deaths of 70 people, including 30 women and 5 children. However, neither Bhan Singh nor Longowal during their recounting of the events that took place on June 6 made any reference to either surrendering to the military or an attack on civilians by the militants.

The government issued White Paper alleged that on 8 June 1984, an unarmed army doctor was abducted by the militants and was hacked to death. However, Giani Puran Singh who was called by the military to act as a mediator to facilitate the surrender of four militants in the basement of the Bunga Jassa Singh Ramgharia, stated that the "so called doctor" had been killed along with two other army personnel when they ventured close to the militant's hiding place.

Indian army 
Former Indian Service Officer Ramesh Inder Singh, the then Deputy Commissioner (DC) of Amritsar in one of his interview with BBC said that even the Governor of (Indian) Punjab did not know that there would be military action and he indicated that the Operation was badly carried out and panic among foot soldiers was so evident that they were formalizing their plans on the bonnets of their vehicles.

Brahma Chellaney, the Associated Press's South Asia correspondent, was the only foreign reporter who managed to stay on in Amritsar despite the media blackout. His dispatches, filed by telex, provided the first non-governmental news reports on the bloody operation in Amritsar. His first dispatch, front-paged by The New York Times, The Times of London and The Guardian, reported a death toll about twice of what authorities had admitted. According to the dispatch, about 780 militants and civilians and 400 troops had perished in fierce gun-battles. Chellaney reported that about "eight to ten" men suspected Sikh militants had been shot with their hands tied. In that dispatch, Mr. Chellaney interviewed a doctor who said he had been picked up by the army and forced to conduct postmortems despite the fact he had never done any postmortem examination before. In reaction to the dispatch, the Indian government charged Chellaney with violating Punjab press censorship, two counts of fanning sectarian hatred and trouble, and later with sedition, calling his report baseless and disputing his casualty figures. The Supreme Court of India ordered Chellaney to cooperate with Amritsar police, who interrogated him concerning his report and sources. Chellaney declined to reveal his source, citing journalistic ethics and the constitutional guarantee of freedom of the press. In September 1985 charges against Chellaney were dropped. The Associated Press stood by the accuracy of the reports and figures, which were "supported by Indian and other press accounts".

Similar accusations of highhandedness by the army and allegations of human rights violations by security forces in Operation Blue Star and subsequent military operations in Punjab have been leveled by Justice V. M. Tarkunde, Mary Anne Weaver, human rights lawyer Ram Narayan Kumar, and anthropologists Cynthia Mahmood and Joyce Pettigrew.

Some of the human rights abuses alleged to have been committed by the Indian army were:
 In April 2017 Justice Gurbir Singh stated that the army's failure to provide any announcement to pilgrims before commencing Operation Bluestar was a human rights violation.
 The Indian army mistreated pilgrims who were detained immediately after the fighting stopped on June 6 by failing to provide them any water. Some pilgrims were reduced to collecting drinking water from the canals that contained dead bodies and were filled with blood.
 Ragi Harcharan Singh stated that on June 6 the Indian army gave its first announcement for evacuation since the commencement of Operation Bluestar. Singh states that he witnessed hundreds of pilgrims, including women, being shot at by the army as they emerged from hiding.
 A female survivor witnessed Indian soldiers line up Sikh men in a que, tie their arms behind their backs with their turbans, beat them with rifle butts until they bled and then executed by being shot.
 Giana Puran Singh stated he along with 3-4 others were used as human shields for the protection of an officer who wanted to inspect the inside of the Darbar Sahib for anyone using a machine gun.
 A member of the AISSF stated that on June 6 those who surrendered before the army were made to lie down on the hot road, interrogated, made to move on their knees, bit with rifle butts and kicked with boots on private parts and their heads. The detainees were made to have their arms tied behind their backs with their own turbans and denied water. At about 7:00 PM the detainees were made to sit on the Parikrama near the army tanks. Many were injured as there was still firing from the side of the Akal Takht.
 Post-mortem reports showed that most of the dead bodies had their hands tied behind their backs, implying they had died after the army assault and not during. These bodies were in a putrid state at the time of post-mortem as they had been exposed in the open for 72 hours before being brought in.

The Indian Army responded to this criticism by stating that they "answered the call of duty as disciplined, loyal and dedicated members of the Armed Forces of India. ... our loyalties are to the nation, the armed forces to which we belong, the uniforms we wear and to the troops we command".

Strategy
Blue Star encompassed 41 other gurdwaras all over Punjab in which more than 3 army divisions were deployed. As later events conclusively proved, the operations was not only flawed in its very concept but marred by poor planning and execution. According to Khushwant Singh,

As reported by Indian Army Major General Afsir Karim, among the main factors of planning and conduct which aggravated the impact of this operation, the foremost decision was to launch the assault on the day of the martyrdom day of Guru Arjan, the builder of the temple, described as "sheer perversity," as a large number of pilgrims were bound to be injured and killed. The date being chosen for its surprise factor, or the presence of pilgrims potentially preventing the militants from responding, showed "cynical disregard" for innocent lives, with "neither good soldiering nor honourable combat" on the part of the senior generals in charge of planning the operation. They would later "make various statements, invent excuses, and shade the truth to hide inconvenient facts." The incompetence resulting in the burning of the Sikh Reference Library was taken as "vengeful vandalism" by the Sikh masses. The additional Army action of Operation Woodrose, where 37 other gurdwaras were subjected to a combing operation, also put the Sikhs on notice and created an atmosphere of terror, widening the scope of the conflict.

There was "little doubt," according to Karim, that it was the operation, because of its lasting adverse effects on the Sikh masses, which put a majority of unemployed Sikh youth, disadvantaged by the economic results of the Green Revolution that the Dharam Yudh Morcha had been launched to ameliorate through the implementation of the Anandpur Sahib Resolution, on the road to insurgency. After the operation a large number crossed the border for training and weaponry, as an operation where "thousands of Sikh youth were humiliated, harassed, and physically hurt was bound to intensify the conflict." Previously the conflict had been limited to a few radical groups and scattered, small-scale incidents; after, it affected all of Punjab, with "organized insurgency not taking root in Punjab until after the operation."

The military operation was a disastrous political decision and severely bungled; Lt. Gen. S. K. Sinha would later characterize the operation as both a political and military blunder, and would cite Sundarji as flouting standard operating procedure laid out by Sinha, seeking army promotion, and impressing Indira Gandhi, who wanted to appear politically strong to her electorate after frustrations in Kashmir. He would also ascribe his dismissal by Gandhi to his attempts to put up his views of the Akali problem, and his long personal friendships with Akalis, which he believed irritated Gandhi.

According to retired Lt. Gen. Shankar Prasad, “It was because of the disasters called Vaidya [who superseded Sinha] and Sundarji—who did not have the brains to pick on the plans left behind by Lt Gen. S.K. Sinha—that we had both a political folly compounded by a military botch-up.” He would blame Sundarji more for the operation than Vaidya, who he says "“was taken in by Sundarji's swagger,” and that both “were being politically subservient to the Prime Minister... maybe they wanted governorships or ambassadorships after serving their time." Prasad also believed that the military high command should have refused to implement the order, and craft a more suitable operation in its place, instead of being pressured by deadlines from the political leadership.

In the UK cabinet secretary's report, contrary to the advice of a British military advisor in February 1984 of surgical strike involving a helicopter-borne commando operation had advised in February 1984, the Indian Army went into the temple "sledgehammer-style," with massive casualties of civilians. The assault on the Golden Temple would be later recognized as a major blunder on the part of the central government even by Congress leaders.

Five years later, the army's strategy was criticised by comparing it with the blockade approach taken by KPS Gill in Operation Black Thunder, when Sikh militants had again taken over the temple complex. It was said that Operation Blue Star could have been averted by using similar blockade tactics. The army responded by stating that "no comparison is possible between the two situations", as "there was no cult figure like Bhindranwale to idolise, and no professional military general like Shahbeg Singh to provide military leadership" and "the confidence of militants having been shattered by Operation Blue Star." Furthermore, it was pointed out that the separatists in the temple were armed with machine guns, anti-tank missiles and Chinese-made armour-piercing rocket launchers, and that they strongly resisted the army's attempts to dislodge them from the shrine, appearing to have planned for a long standoff, having arranged for water to be supplied from wells within the temple compound and had stocked food provisions that could have lasted months.

Honours to the soldiers
The soldiers and generals involved in the Operation were presented with gallantry awards, honours, decoration strips and promotions by the Indian president Zail Singh, a Sikh, in a ceremony conducted on 10 July 1985. The act was criticized by authors and activists such as Harjinder Singh Dilgeer, who accused the troops of human rights violations during the operation.

British involvement
The accidental release of secret documents in the United Kingdom in 2014 revealed that the Thatcher government was aware of the Indian government's intention to storm the temple and that a SAS officer was tasked to advise the Indian authorities on removing the armed Sikh militants from the Golden Temple. According to a report by the Sikh Federation of UK, India was one of the biggest purchasers of military equipment for UK between 1981 and 1990. Most of the Foreign Office's documents on India from 1984  are classified in whole or in part.

See also 
 Kharku

References

Further reading
 : presents comprehensive details of the invasion of Indian Army (causes and events). Vols 7 to 10 also give precious information.
 : presents the version of Giani Kirpal Singh, the Jathedar of the Akal Takht.

External links
 Operation Blue Star Gallery (Archive)
 Operation Blue Star Photos

Massacres in religious buildings and structures
Massacres of Sikhs
History of Sikhism
Khalistan movement
Amritsar
Insurgency in Punjab
1984 in India
Conflicts in 1984
Indira Gandhi administration
Assassination of Indira Gandhi
Operations involving Indian special forces
Attacks on religious buildings and structures in India
Massacres in 1984
20th-century mass murder in India
Mass shootings in India
June 1984 events in Asia
Counterterrorism in India
1984 mass shootings in Asia
1984 murders in India